Warrenton High School may refer to:

Warrenton High School (Missouri)
Warrenton High School (Oregon)